ISO 3166-2:RS is the entry for Serbia in ISO 3166-2, part of the ISO 3166 standard published by the International Organization for Standardization (ISO), which defines codes for the names of the principal subdivisions (e.g., provinces or states) of all countries coded in ISO 3166-1.

Currently for Serbia, ISO 3166-2 codes are defined for two levels of subdivisions:
 2 autonomous provinces
 1 city and 29 districts

The city Belgrade is the capital of the country and has special status equal to the districts.

Each code consists of two parts, separated by a hyphen. The second part is either of the following:
 two letters: autonomous provinces
 two digits: city and districts

The digits for the city and districts are assigned as follows:
 00: city
 01–07: districts in the autonomous province Vojvodina
 08–24: districts in Central Serbia
 25–29: districts in the autonomous province Kosovo-Metohija (different from the districts established when it was under the interim administration of the United Nations Mission in Kosovo, and currently used by the de facto independent Republic of Kosovo)

Before the dissolution of Serbia and Montenegro in 2006, Serbia was assigned the ISO 3166-2 code  under the entry for Serbia and Montenegro.

Current codes
Subdivision names are listed as in the ISO 3166-2 standard published by the ISO 3166 Maintenance Agency (ISO 3166/MA).

Click on the button in the header to sort each column.

Autonomous provinces

Note

City and districts

Changes
The following changes to the entry have been announced in newsletters by the ISO 3166/MA since the first publication of ISO 3166–2 in 1998. ISO stopped issuing newsletters in 2013.

The following changes to the entry are listed on ISO's online catalogue, the Online Browsing Platform:

See also
Country codes of Serbia
Subdivisions of Serbia
NUTS codes of Serbia

References

External links
 ISO Online Browsing Platform: RS
 Districts of Serbia, Statoids.com

2:RS
ISO 3166-2
Serbia geography-related lists